A total lunar eclipse took place on Wednesday, January 8, 1936. It was the second total lunar eclipse of Saros series 133.

Visibility

Related lunar eclipses

Half-Saros cycle
A lunar eclipse will be preceded and followed by solar eclipses by 9 years and 5.5 days (a half saros). This lunar eclipse is related to two annular solar eclipses of Solar Saros 140.

See also
List of lunar eclipses
List of 20th-century lunar eclipses

Notes

External links

1936-01
1936 in science